Sean Murray (15 June 1898 – 26 May 1961) was an Irish Communist political activist, and organiser, born in 1898 the son of a small farmer in Cushendall, Co. Antrim. His grandfather was a United Irishman during the 1798 rebellion. In 1919 Murray joined the IRA and was arrested and detained in the Curragh Camp during the Irish War of Independence. Following the Anglo-Irish Treaty of 1921 he sided with the Anti-Treaty side.

In 1924 Murray moved to London and while there joined the Communist Party of Great Britain. He was an attendee of the International Lenin School with Padraic Breslin and James Larkin Jnr.
 
Murray was general secretary of the Communist Party of Ireland (CPI) from 1933 to 1940 and the editor of its newspaper The Irish Workers' Voice. Following the split in 1941 he was Secretary and chairman of Communist Party of Northern Ireland (CPNI) as well as National Organiser of the CPI.

He represented the CPNI and the Irish Worker League at the 1960 International Meeting of Communist and Workers Parties.

Publications
 'Revolt 1916 and After' by Sean Murray published by Communist Party of Ireland and Communist Party of Great Britain (1936)

References
Notes

Further reading

1898 births
1961 deaths
Communist Party of Ireland politicians
Irish communists
People from County Antrim